A Software Process Improvement Network (SPIN) is an organization of professionals who are interested in software and systems process improvement. As of a few years ago, there were 116 SPINs in 37 countries worldwide in their individual geographical areas.

Each SPIN is a completely independent organization. The Software Engineering Institute (SEI) previously provided support to the SPINs by creating, maintaining, and distributing the SPIN Directory; connecting those software professionals with emerging or existing SPINs; and distributing the SPINs start-up information.

See also
Software Engineering Institute
ISO 15504

External links
 Software Engineering Institute (SEI)
 Bangalore, India SPIN
 Chicago SPIN
 Milwaukee SPIN
 Tehran SPIN
 Cape Town SPIN
 Chennai SPIN, India

Software engineering organizations